Indianola Historic District is a historic district in Indianola, Mississippi. The district is roughly bounded by Percy Street on the north, Front to Adair on the west to Roosevelt, Roosevelt on the east to Front Extended and north.

The district features Queen Anne style and Tudor Revival architecture. The area was added to the National Register of Historic Places in 2009.

References

Queen Anne architecture in Mississippi
Tudor Revival architecture in Mississippi
Geography of Sunflower County, Mississippi
Historic districts on the National Register of Historic Places in Mississippi
National Register of Historic Places in Sunflower County, Mississippi